The 1961 European Figure Skating Championships is an annual figure skating competition sanctioned by the International Skating Union in which figure skaters compete for the title of European Champion in the disciplines of men's singles, ladies' singles, pair skating, and ice dancing.

The competitions took place from January 26 to 29, 1961 in West Berlin, West Germany. The event took place without the participation of skaters from the Soviet Union not because of a political boycott, but rather because an exceptionally mild winter left the Russian skaters with insufficient ice for practice in their home country. The Soviet team was also withdrawn from the originally planned World Championships for the same reason, but that tournament was subsequently cancelled after Sabena Flight 548.

The defending champions in all four divisions retained their titles. In the pairs competition, however, the champions Marika Kilius & Hans-Jürgen Bäumler faced a close battle with Margret Göbl & Franz Ningel, who had defeated them at the West German championships earlier in the season. Göbl & Ningel may have been penalized for including an illegal lift in their program.

In the ladies' event, Sjoukje Dijkstra built up a lead in the compulsory figures that assured her of victory. Her free skating program was described as "exhausting". The stars of the free skating were Helli Sengstschmidt and Jana Mrázková, who both reportedly did triple salchow jumps in their programs.

Alain Giletti likewise assured himself of victory by winning the figures by a large margin. All three medalists in the men's division gave fine free skating performances.

Results

Men

Judges were
 Hans Meixner 
 P. Baron 
 E. A. Voigt 
 K. Beyer 
 Pamela Davis 
 Ferenc Kertész 
 G. De Mori 
 C. Benedict-Stieber 
 A. Jaisli

Ladies

Judges were
 Martin Felsenreich 
 E. Skakala 
 N. Valdes 
 A. Walker 
 G. S. Yates 
 Ferenc Kertész 
 Grazia Ferrari-Barcellona 
 C. Engelfriet 
 Karl Enderlin

Pairs

Judges were
 Hans Meixner 
 E. Skakala 
 N. Valdes 
 E. Bauch 
 Theo Klemm 
 Pamela Davis 
 G. de Mori 
 C. Benedict-Stieber 
 A. Jaisli

Ice dancing

Judges were
 W. Malek 
 E. Skakala 
 L. Lauret 
 Hermann Schiechtl 
 H. Lawrence 
 Ferenc Kertész 
 C. Benacchi-Bordogna

References

Sources
 Result List provided by the ISU
 printed program of the Europeans

European Figure Skating Championships
European Figure Skating Championships
1961 European Figure Skating Championships
International figure skating competitions hosted by West Germany
January 1961 sports events in Europe